Meybod County is in Yazd province, Iran. The capital of the county is the city of Meybod. At the 2006 census, the county's population was 70,728 in 19,076 households. The following census in 2011 counted 82,840 people in 23,300 households. At the 2016 census, the county's population was 99,727 in 29,684 households, by which time Nadushan Rural District and the city of Nadushan had been separated from Ashkezar County to join Meybod County.

Administrative divisions

The population history and structural changes of Meybod County's administrative divisions over three consecutive censuses are shown in the following table. The latest census shows three districts, five rural districts, and three cities.

References

 

Counties of Yazd Province